James Alexander Mackay (21 November 1936 – 12 August 2007) was a prolific Scottish writer and philatelist whose output of philatelic works was rivalled only by Fred Melville. He was described by John Holman, editor of the British Philatelic Bulletin, as a "philatelic writer without equal" but his reputation was damaged by a conviction for theft from the British Museum early in his career, which cost him his job there, and multiple accusations of plagiarism.

Early life and family 
James Mackay was born in Inverness on 21 November 1936. He was educated in Glasgow, where he also attended the university. Later in life Mackay was awarded a Doctor of Literature (D.Litt.) degree by Glasgow University.

He married Renate.

Scottish posts 
Interested in stamps and the postal system from an early age, he wrote two acclaimed histories of the Scottish posts; one limited to St. Kilda and, in 1978, his History of Scottish Postmarks, 1693–1978, the definitive work on the subject. He became a prolific philatelic author, especially on English, Irish and Scottish postmarks and also produced popular Postal History Annuals and island series books. He wrote some 200 books and at least 10,000 articles. Mackay's interest in the postal history of St Kilda had been formed during his time stationed there during his army service in the 1950s.

Theft from the British Museum 
In 1972 Mackay was dismissed from his job as an assistant keeper at the British Museum in London after he was convicted at the Old Bailey of stealing valuable proof stamps. He had pleaded guilty to five charges of stealing progressive proofs on loan from the Crown Agents from the Museum in 1965 and 1966 and was fined £1000. He had exchanged the proofs with dealer Clive Feigenbaum for Winston Churchill-themed stamps.

Writing 
He was the editor of The Burns Chronicle from 1976 to 1992, which under his stewardship reached a level of quality and diversity it has not achieved before or since. He then turned to biography, where he was less successful. Through the 1980s he worked on a biography of Robert Burns which was published in 1992 to favourable reviews and which won the Saltire Society Book of the Year Award. Subsequent biographies of Allan Pinkerton and William Wallace received more mixed reviews.

1996 saw the release of Michael Collins: A Life, a work about the life of the famed Irish revolutionary which received excellent reviews.

Mackay also wrote books under a number of different pseudonyms, including Ian Angus, William Finlay, Bruce Garden, Alex Matheson and Peter Whittington.

Accusations of plagiarism
In 1998, he published a biography of Alexander Graham Bell. It was on the market briefly before Robert V. Bruce published a damning indictment, detailing sustained plagiarism of his own work, Alexander Graham Bell and the Conquest of Solitude. Far from being a little-known work, the latter had in fact been nominated for the Pulitzer Prize in 1973. The indictment, published in the American Historical Association's house journal, counted instances of plagiarism on 80 percent of the pages published. Mackay paid his publishers to withdraw the book from circulation, and Bruce agreed not to sue.

Mackay then published a biography of John Paul Jones, the founder of the US Navy. While initially well received, and the subject of flattering reviews in the trade press, it was soon discovered that it was practically a copy of what those same reviews had marked as the last work on the man, that by Samuel Eliot Morison in 1942. That biography too had won the Pulitzer. Columbia University history professor David Armitage was quoted in the New York Times as saying that the book was "a spectacular and sustained act of plagiarism."

Despite these accusations, Mackay continued to be commissioned to write articles for the philatelic press, and it has been said that almost the entire text of some editions of Stamp & Coin Mart, a popular British magazine, were written by him.

Death 
Mackay died on 12 August 2007 at the age of 70 in Glasgow.

Publications

Philatelic
St Kilda; Its Posts and Communications, 1963, 73p.
The Tapling Collection of Postage Stamps and Telegraph Stamps and Postal Stationery, British Museum, 53 pp, 1964
The World of Stamps:thematic essays on recent new issues London: Johnson, 1964, 220p.
Tristan Da Cunha: Its Postal History and Philately, 72 pp, Mackay & Crabb, 1965
Commonwealth Stamp Design 1840-1965, British Museum, 32 pp, 1965
Malta - The story of Malta and her stamps, Philatelic Publishers, 96 pp, 1966, 
Great Britain: the story of Great Britain and her stamps London: Philatelic Publishers, 1967, 158p. 
Make Money with Stamps by Bruce Garden (pseudonym). London: Philatelic Publishers, 1967, 61p.  
Money in Stamps, Johnson Publications, 240 pp, 1967, 
Learn about stamps by Bruce Garden (pseudonym). London: Philatelic Publishers, 1968, 61p.  
The Story of Éire and Her Stamps, Philatelic Publishers, 1968
Cover Collecting - A Collecta Guide to First Day & Other Covers, Philatelic Publishers, 1968
East Africa: The Story of East Africa and Its Stamps, Philatelic Publishers, 192 pp, 1970, 
New Encyclopedia of Stamps, IPC Magazines, 1970
Airmails, 1870-1970, Batsford, 216 pp, 1971, 
 The World of Classic Stamps; 1840-1870, New York: Putnam, 1972.
The Dictionary of Stamps in Colour, Michael Joseph, 296 pp, 1973, 
 Stamps, posts, and postmarks, by Ian Angus (pseudonym). London: Ward Lock, 1973. , 128p.
An Illustrated History of Stamp Design by William Finlay (pseudonym), Peter Lowe, 187 pp, 1974, 
Encyclopedia of World Stamps, 1945-1975, Lionel Leventhal Ltd, 160 pp, 1976, 
Scottish Postmarks 1693-1987, J.A. Mackay: self-published, 68 pp, 1978
The Circular Name Stamps of Scotland, J.A. Mackay: self-published, 1978
The Skeleton Postmarks of Scotland, J.A. Mackay: self-published, 1978
The Floating Post Offices of the Clyde, J.A. Mackay: self-published, 1979, 40p.
English and Welsh Postmarks Since 1840, J.A. Mackay: self-published, 1980, 254pp.
Stamp Collecting, Park Lane Press, 80pp, 1980
British Post Office Numbers 1924-1969, J.A. Mackay: self-published, 50 pp, 1981
Telegraphic Codes of the British Isles, 1879-1924, J.A. Mackay: self-published, 90 pp, 1981
The Parcel Post of the British Isles, J.A. Mackay: self-published, 232 pp, 1982
Registered Mail of the British Isles, J.A. Mackay: self-published, 395 pp, 1982
Irish Postmarks Since 1840, J.A. Mackay: self-published, 222 pp, 1982
The Guinness Book of Stamps: Facts and Feats, Enfield: Guinness Publishing, 225 pp, 1982, ; 2nd Edition, Guinness Publishing Ltd, 225 pp, 1989, 
Official Mail of the British Isles, J.A. Mackay: self-published, 349 pp, 1983
Scottish Twin-Arc Postmarks with Stampers Numbers 1894-1963, J.A. Mackay: self-published, 1983, 53p.
The Postal History of Glasgow, J.A. Mackay: self-published, 1984
Surcharged Mail of the British Isles, J.A. Mackay: self-published, 1984, 138 pp
British Stamps, Longman, 247 pp, 1985, 
Dátstampái Rubair na bhFo-Oificí an Phoist in Éirinn, J.A. Mackay: self-published, 1985 , 96p.
Sub Office Rubber Datestamps of Ireland, J.A. Mackay: self-published, 1985 , 68p. 
Sub Office Rubber Datestamps of Scotland, J.A. Mackay: self-published, 1985 , 63p.
Postal History of Dumfries, 1986, self-published, 120 pp, 
Sub Office Rubber Datestamps of England and Wales, J.A. Mackay: self-published, 1986,   
English Provincial Krags (Machine Cancellations), 1987
Irish Slogan Postmarks 1918-1986, J.A. Mackay: self-published, 1987 , 69p.
Postmarks of England and Wales, J.A. Mackay: self-published, 352 pp, 1988, 
Under the Gum – Background to British Stamps 1840–1940, Limassol: James Bendon, 1997, 536p.
Philatelic Terms Illustrated, Stanley Gibbons Limited, 4th edition, 2003, 173 pp, 
The World Encyclopedia of Stamps and Stamp Collecting, 2005, Lorenz Books, 256 pp, 
1800 Stamps of the World: A Stunning Visual Directory of Rare and Familiar Issues, Organized Country by Country with over 1800 Images of Collectables from up to 200 Countries, Southwater, 160 pp, 2007, 
Postal History Annual 1979	J.A. Mackay: self-published			1979
Postal History Annual 1980	J.A. Mackay: self-published			1980
Postal History Annual 1981	J.A. Mackay: self-published			1981
Postal History Annual 1982	J.A. Mackay: self-published			1982
Postal History Annual 1983	J.A. Mackay: self-published			1983
Postal History Annual 1984	J.A. Mackay: self-published			1984
Postal History Annual 1985	J.A. Mackay: self-published			1985
Postal History Annual 1986	J.A. Mackay: self-published			1986

Scottish Islands Postal History Series

No. 1: Harris & St Kilda	J.A. Mackay: self-published	80 pgs
No. 2: The Uists & Barra	J.A. Mackay: self-published	57 pgs
No. 3: Lewis	J.A. Mackay: self-published	62 pgs
No. 4: Skye and the Small Isles	J.A. Mackay: self-published	70 pgs
No. 5: Arran & Cumbrae	J.A. Mackay: self-published	39 pgs
No. 6: Bute	J.A. Mackay: self-published	38 pgs
No. 7: Orkney & Stroma	J.A. Mackay: self-published	64 pgs
No. 8: Shetland	J.A. Mackay: self-published	70 pgs
No. 9: Mull, Iona, Coll & Tiree	J.A. Mackay: self-published	37 pgs
No. 10: Islay, Jura and the other Argyll Isles	J.A. Mackay: self-published	39 pgs
No. 11: Scottish Islands Supplement & Catalogue	J.A. Mackay: self-published	64 pgs
No. 12: Isle of Wight	J.A. Mackay: self-published	112 pgs

Biographies
Vagabond of Verse: Robert Service - a Biography, Trafalgar Square, 1996
Allan Pinkerton: The First Private Eye, John Wiley & Sons, Somerset, NJ, 1997
Michael Collins: A Life, Trafalgar Square, 1997
Alexander Graham Bell: A Life, John Wiley & Sons, Somerset, NJ, 1998
William Wallace: Brave Heart, Mainstream, 1995
The Man Who Invented Himself: a Life of Sir Thomas Lipton, Mainstream Publishing, Edinburgh  , 1998

Robert Burns
The Complete Letters of Robert Burns, 1987, Alloway Publishing, 862 pp, 
The Complete Works of Robert Burns, 1988, Hyperion Books, 704 pp, 
Burns A-Z: the Complete Word Finder, 1990, (self published), 774 pp, 
Burns: A Biography of Robert Burns, 1992, Mainstream Publishing, 672 pp, 
Robert Burns, the Complete Poetical Works, 1993, Alloway Publishing Ltd, 640 pp, 
Burns, A Biography, 2004, Alloway Publishing Ltd, 749 pp,

Other subjects
Antiques of the future; a guide for collectors and investors, 1970, Universe Books, 208 pp, 
Glass Paperweights, Littlehampton Book Services Ltd, 1973, 136 pp, 
The Animaliers: A Collector's Guide to the Animal Sculptors of the 19th & 20th Centuries, Dutton, 1973, 160 pp, 
Dictionary of Western Sculptors in Bronze, 1973, Antique Collector's Club, 1977, 414 pp, 
Coins: Facts and Feats, 1993, Spink & Son Ltd, 276 pp, 
Clans and Tartans of Scotland, 2000, 
Glasgow's Other River : Exploring the Kelvin, 2000, Fort Publishing Ltd, 240 pp, published under pseudonym Alex Matheson, 
Soldiering on St Kilda, 2002, Token Publishing Ltd, 180 pp, 
The St Kilda Steamers, 2006, The History Press Ltd, 192 pp,

References and sources
Notes

Sources
John Holman, Obituary: James Alexander Mackay: Philatelic writer without equal, Gibbons Stamp Monthly, October 2007, p. 16.

External links
  Stamp & Coin Mart
 James A. Mackay papers, 1963-2002 Stuart A. Rose Manuscript, Archives, and Rare Book Library, Emory University

1936 births
2007 deaths
People from Inverness
British philatelists
Writers from Glasgow
20th-century Scottish historians
Criminals from Glasgow
Alumni of the University of Glasgow
People associated with the British Museum
Scottish biographers
British people convicted of theft
People involved in plagiarism controversies
21st-century Scottish historians
Philatelic authors
20th-century biographers
21st-century biographers